Gillingham Football Club is an English professional association football club based in Gillingham, Kent, playing in EFL League One, the third level of the English football league system, as of the 2021–22 season. The club was formed in 1893 as New Brompton F.C., changing its name to Gillingham in 1912.  The club joined The Football League in 1920, was voted out of the league in favour of Ipswich Town at the end of the 1937–38 season, but returned to the league 12 years later after it was expanded from 88 to 92 clubs.  Between 2000 and 2005, Gillingham played in the second tier of English football for the only time in the club's history, achieving a highest league finish of eleventh place in 2002–03.  The club's first team have competed in numerous nationally and regionally organised competitions, and all players who have played between 1 and 24 such matches, either as a member of the starting eleven or as a substitute, are listed below.

Several players have contributed significantly to the history of the club, despite playing relatively few games.  Tom Gilbey scored the club's first goal in The Football League on the opening day of the 1920–21 season.  In 2007, Luke Freeman set records as both the youngest player ever to represent the club and the youngest player ever to play for any club in the rounds proper (i.e. excluding the qualifying rounds) of the FA Cup, aged 15.  Glenn Roeder made seven appearances during a one-season spell as player-manager in the 1992–93 season, in which the "Gills" narrowly avoided finishing bottom of The Football League and being relegated into non-League football.  Tony Pulis, who played 17 times for the club in the 1989–90 season, would return as manager in 1995 and lead the club to promotion from the Football League Third Division.  Players who made few appearances for Gillingham but achieved greater success outside football include Les Ames and Laurie Fishlock, both of whom played Test cricket for England, and Billy Ivison, who played rugby league for Great Britain.

All players who have played between 1 and 24 first-team matches for the club, either as a member of the starting eleven or as a substitute, are listed below. Each player's details include the duration of his career with Gillingham, his typical playing position while with the club, and the number of matches played and goals scored in all senior competitive matches.

Key
The list is ordered first by number of appearances, and then date of debut.
Appearances as a substitute are included. This feature of the game was introduced in The Football League at the start of the 1965–66 season.
Statistics are correct up to the end of the 2021–22 season.

Players

See also
List of Gillingham F.C. players, for those players with 50 or more appearances for the club
List of Gillingham F.C. players (25–49 appearances)

References

Works cited

 
Gillingham F.C. players
Association football player non-biographical articles